Another Passenger is the sixth studio album by American singer-songwriter Carly Simon, released by Elektra Records, on June 5, 1976.

For this album, Simon enlisted a new producer, Ted Templeman, as well as his clients, The Doobie Brothers and Little Feat, to provide musical and vocal backing. On May 8, 1976, four weeks before the album was released, Simon made her first and (to date) only appearance on Saturday Night Live, performing "Half a Chance" and her signature song "You're So Vain".

Reception and packaging 

Another Passenger peaked at No. 29 on the Billboard Pop albums chart. The lead single "It Keeps You Runnin'" peaked at No. 46 on the Pop singles chart and No. 27 on the Adult Contemporary chart, while the second single "Half a Chance" appeared only on the Adult Contemporary chart, peaking at No. 39. Despite the lukewarm commercial reception, the album was, and remains, one of Simon's best-reviewed works. Ken Tucker, writing in Rolling Stone, called it "Carly Simon's best record", and referred to the track "Cowtown" as the "finest song she has written". He also singled out the ("loping, slick") "Half a Chance" and the ("tropical thumper") "Darkness 'Til Dawn" as "equally entertaining" tracks. AllMusic rated the album 3 out of 5 stars, calling it "an album full of tasty licks". It has also gone on to become a favorite among many of Simon's fans. 

Cash Box said of the single "Half a Chance" that "the chorus is authoritative, filled with confidence, and, as usual, her words are striking." The track "Libby" was included on Simon's 1995 three-disc box set Clouds in My Coffee 1965-1995, and the track "In Times When My Head" was included on Simon's 2002 career spanning collection Anthology, as well as her 2015 compilation Songs from the Trees (A Musical Memoir Collection).

Film director Terrence Malick appears on the back cover smoking at a bar.

Track listing
Credits adapted from the album's liner notes.

Personnel

Musicians

Production

Charts
Album – Billboard (United States)

Album – International

Singles – Billboard (United States)

References

External links
Carly Simon's Official Website

1976 albums
Carly Simon albums
Albums produced by Ted Templeman
Elektra Records albums
Albums recorded at Sunset Sound Recorders